Qingshanqiao is a rural town in Xiangtan County, Hunan Province, China.

Administrative division
The town is divided into 40 villages and 1 community:
Qingshan Community
Qingshanqiao Village
Xinpu Village
Xiaonan Village
Shangfang Village
Shalin Village
Dahe Village
Caoyi Village
Songbai Village
Fuchong Village
Yanyan Village
Sijing Village
Gaoshansi Village
Gaotun Village
Fengping Village
Hejia Village
Xinyang Village
Malan Village
Longshu Village
Long'an Village
Changtang Village
Fushi Village
Fuxiao Village
Guanshan Village
Sanfu Village
Qunqiang Village
Xintian Village
Qiaotou Village
Guangfu Village
Lianxing Village
Aiguo Village
Shibantang Village
Longwu Village
Dacang Village
Shitang Village
Aoyu Village
Xialing Village
Jinshi Village
Tiantang Village
Gaoqing Village
and Shimen Village

Geography
Qingshan River, a tributary of the Xiang River, flows through the town.

Economy
The region abounds with uranium mine.

Rice and pig are important to the economy.

Culture
Huaguxi is the most influence local theater.

Attractions

See also 
Qingshanqiao, Ningxiang County

References

External links
 

Divisions of Xiangtan County